Saremsaqlu or Sarem Saqlu may refer to:
 Sarem Saqlu, West Azerbaijan
 Saremsaqlu, Zanjan